The 2019 Mediterranean Beach Games (Greek: Μεσογειακοί Παράκτιοι Αγώνες 2019) is the second edition of the Mediterranean Beach Games. It was held from 25 to 31 August 2019 in Patras, Greece.

Host city selection
The Greek city of Patras was elected as host city of the second edition of the Mediterranean Beach Games (2019) during the ordinary General Assembly of the ICMG which was held in 2017 at Tarragona, Spain.

Sports
Eleven sports will feature in these Games.

Participating nations
26 member nations of the International Committee for the Mediterranean Games competed in the II Mediterranean Beach Games. To the countries that participated in 2015 there was  an addition of two more: Portugal and Kosovo.

Medal table
Final medal standings are shown below, information from official website of 2019 Mediterranean Beach Games for 55 events. One share gold and one shared silver in finswimming.

Medalists

Aquathlon

Beach handball

Beach soccer

Beach tennis

Beach volleyball

Beach wrestling

Canoe ocean racing

Finswimming
Men

Women

Mixed

Open water swimming

Rowing beach sprint

Water skiing

Venues

References

Mediterranean Beach Games
Multi-sport events in Greece
2019 in Greek sport
Mediterranean Beach Games
Sport in Patras
International sports competitions hosted by Greece
Med